Arif Wala railway station is located in Arifwala, Pakistan.

See also
 List of railway stations in Pakistan
 Pakistan Railways

References

Railway stations in Pakpattan District
Railway stations on Lodhran–Raiwind Line